Leopoldina Bălănuță (10 December 1934 – 14 October 1998) was a Romanian actress.

Biography
She was born in her grandparents' house in Hăulișca, Vrancea County, the daughter of Neculai Bălănuță, a priest, and Sanda. She was a 1958 graduate of the Institute of Theatre and Film Arts (IATC), Bucharest.

Her father was an Orthodox priest in Focșani. She was married to actor Mitică Popescu. She died in Bucharest, and was buried in the city's Bellu Cemetery.

Selected filmography
 The Subterranean (1967), as Irina Jelescu
 The Moment (1979), as Maria Nobilu
 The Oak (1992), as Nela's mother

References

External links

1934 births
1998 deaths
People from Vrancea County
Caragiale National University of Theatre and Film alumni
20th-century Romanian actresses
Romanian film actresses
Recipients of the Order of Cultural Merit (Romania)
Burials at Bellu Cemetery